Karl-Heinz Sievers (born 2 October 1942) is a German former long-distance runner. He competed in the marathon at the 1968 Summer Olympics representing West Germany.

References

External links
 

1942 births
Living people
Athletes (track and field) at the 1968 Summer Olympics
German male long-distance runners
German male marathon runners
Olympic athletes of West Germany
People from Ammerland
Sportspeople from Lower Saxony
20th-century German people